Hetero Drugs is an Indian pharmaceutical company and the world’s largest producer of anti-retroviral drugs. Hetero’s business includes APIs, generics, biosimilars, custom pharmaceutical services, and branded generics.

Operations
Hetero group employs over 21,000 people. Hetero is a player in the active pharmaceutical ingredients market and finished dosages. It has marketing presence in over 127 countries.

Hetero has supplied antiretroviral drugs to patients across more than 100 countries globally.

Today, Oseltamivir, sold under its brand name Fluvir, is also indicated for A[H1N1] virus, also known as swine flu.

Hetero also produces hepatitis C antivirals such as Sofovir (sofosbuvir) and Ledifos (a fixed-dose combination of sofosbuvir and ledipasvir).

Company structure
Hetero Group's subsidiaries include Hetero Drugs, Hetero Labs, Hetero Research Foundation, Genx Laboratories and also foreign subsidiaries such as Camber Pharma Inc. in United States, Hetero Europe in Europe, Amarox Pharma Global in Indonesia, and Richmond Labs in Argentina. The group is also investing in the wind power industry with a goal to reach 1000 megawatts by 2017.

2009 Swine flu outbreak
In 2009, as the swine flu outbreak was spreading across the globe and various health organizations and government agencies were piling up stocks of Oseltamivir as precautionary measures, Hetero supplied generic Oseltamivir under its brand name Fluvir.

Hetero delivered 10 million doses of Oseltamivir to the Indian government in 2009, and shipped about 80 million doses to over 60 countries. Hetero received its second order from Indian government to supply another 10 million doses of Oseltamivir later in 2009.

COVID-19 experimental drugs
The company has launched the generic version of experimental COVID-19 drug Remdesivir under brand name Covifor after acquiring license from Gilead Sciences and obtaining approval from CDSCO, the Indian drug control authority. On July 29, 2020 the company launched its version of the anti viral drug Favipiravir under the brand name Favivir, after getting approval from  Drugs Controller General of India (DCGI), used in the treatment of mild to moderate COVID-19 patients. On November 27, 2020, Hetero Labs signed an agreement with the Russian Direct Investment Fund (RDIF) to manufacture 100 million doses of the Sputnik V vaccine.

References

Pharmaceutical companies of India
Manufacturing companies based in Hyderabad, India
Pharmaceutical companies established in 1993
1993 establishments in Andhra Pradesh